Thaddeus Joseph Dulski (September 27, 1915 – October 11, 1988) was an American congressman who represented the state of New York from 1959 to 1974.

Biography
Dulski was born in  Buffalo, New York, USA on September 27, 1915.  He graduated from Buffalo's Technical High School, and studied at Canisius College and the University at Buffalo.

Career 
He worked as a tax consultant and accountant, and served in the United States Navy during World War II.

From 1940 to 1947 he worked for the Bureau of Internal Revenue and the Office of Price Stabilization.  He was elected to the Buffalo City Council representing the Walden District for two terms starting in 1953, and was elected councilman at large in 1957.

Tenure in Congress 
He served in the House of Representatives as a Democrat from 1959 until he resigned on December 31, 1974.  During his House tenure, he served as a member of the Post Office and Civil Service Committee, of which he was chairman from 1967 until his resignation from Congress.  His Congressional career included helping craft legislation to change the federal Post Office Department into the U.S. Postal Service.

Later career and death 
After leaving Congress, Dulski was a special assistant to Governor Hugh Carey, with whom he had served in the U.S. House.

He retired in 1983 and died of leukemia in Buffalo on October 11, 1988.  He funeral took place at Queen of Peace Catholic Church in Buffalo, and he was buried at Mount Calvary Cemetery in Cheektowaga, New York.

Family
Dulski was married to Elizabeth "Betty" (Wozniak) Dulski (1915-2001).  They were the parents of five children: Suzanne; Christine; Diane; Anthony; and Leon.

Legacy
The Thaddeus J. Dulski Building was a federal office building in Buffalo.  It was vacated by the government in 2005, and later redeveloped as The Avant.

References
 

 Dulski's obituary at the New York Times

1915 births
1988 deaths
University at Buffalo alumni
American politicians of Polish descent
Democratic Party members of the United States House of Representatives from New York (state)
Deaths from leukemia
20th-century American politicians
Buffalo Common Council members